Abid Ali (29 March 1952 – 5 September 2019) was a Pakistani actor, director and producer.

Ali acted in over 200 films and numerous television dramas but is best known for his role as Dilawar Khan in the PTV's classic drama Waris (1979).

Family
He was married twice. From his first marriage to actress and singer Humaira Ali (née Chaudhry), he had three daughters including the supermodel-turned-actress Iman Ali as well as the actress and singer Rahma Ali.

Early life and career
Born and educated in Quetta, Abid Ali was attracted to the arts from early age, writing stories and painting in his childhood and teenage years, and first joined Radio Pakistan before going to Lahore after some struggle and launching his successful TV career with PTV's drama serial Jhok Sial in 1973.

He launched himself as a director and producer with the 1993-hit drama Dasht, also the first private production for Pakistan, while the same year, for PTV this time, he directed the drama Doosra Aasman, the first drama shot abroad, followed by other projects for many channels, including  Saheli in 2007, or Massi aur Malka, a family based-drama, in 2009, usually acting in these serials as well.

Illness and death 
Abid Ali was hospitalized on 2 September 2019 at Liaquat National Hospital in Karachi. He died on 5 September 2019 due to liver failure while in the hospital, aged 67. He was laid to rest on 6 September 2019 after his funeral prayers were held at Masjid-e-Aashiq in Bahria Town, Karachi.

Awards and recognition
Pride of Performance Award by the President of Pakistan in 1986.

Filmography

Films

Television

See also 
 List of Lollywood actors

References

External links
 

Pakistani male film actors
Pakistani male television actors
Pakistani television directors
People from Quetta
1952 births
2019 deaths
Punjabi people
Nigar Award winners
Hum Award winners
Recipients of the Pride of Performance
Pakistani actor-politicians
Male actors in Urdu cinema